The Laeiszhalle, formerly Musikhalle Hamburg, is a concert hall in the Neustadt of Hamburg, Germany and home to the Hamburger Symphoniker and the Philharmoniker Hamburg. The hall is named after the German shipowning company F. Laeisz, founder of the concert venue. The Baroque Revival Laeiszhalle was planned by the architect Martin Haller and inaugurated at its location on the Hamburg Wallring on 4 June 1908. At that time, the Musikhalle was Germany's largest and most modern concert hall.

Composers such as Richard Strauss, Sergei Prokofiev, Igor Stravinsky and Paul Hindemith played and conducted their works in the Laeiszhalle. Pianist Vladimir Horowitz gave one of his first international performances in 1926; violinist Yehudi Menuhin gave a guest performance in 1930 at the age of twelve. Following World War II, which it survived intact, the Laeiszhalle experienced an intermezzo when the British occupying forces used the space temporarily as a broadcast studio for their radio station BFN. Maria Callas gave concerts in 1959 and 1962. In the 1960s the musical repertoire was also expanded to jazz and pop music, with performances by Pink Floyd, Kraftwerk, Grateful Dead, Lale Andersen, Bee Gees, Lynyrd Skynyrd, Udo Jürgens and Elton John.

The Laeizhalle has two separate performance spaces. Due to its relatively low capacity and stage layout, the Laeiszhalle is particularly suitable for the performance of classical and early romantic repertoire, and less so for staging large-scale twentieth-century works. The management of both the Elbphilharmonie and the Laeiszhalle are under the direction of one concert company. Christoph Lieben-Seutter became General and Artistic Director in 2007.

See also
 List of theatres and stages in Hamburg
 List of concert halls

References

External links

Laeiszhalle Elbphilharmonie Hamburg

Buildings and structures in Hamburg-Mitte
Concert halls in Germany
Music in Hamburg
Tourist attractions in Hamburg
Laeisz family
Music venues completed in 1908
1908 establishments in Germany
1908 architecture
Baroque Revival architecture